Julien Mathieu (born 22 April 1982) is a former French tennis player.

Mathieu has a career high ATP singles ranking of 562 achieved on 24 September 2007. He also has a career high ATP doubles ranking of 735 achieved on 9 July 2001.

Mathieu made his ATP main draw debut at the 2006 Grand Prix de Tennis de Lyon after qualifying for the singles main draw.

References

External links

1982 births
Living people
French male tennis players